The koruna, or crown, (sign: Kč; code: CZK) has been the currency of the Czech Republic since 1993. The koruna is one of the European Union's 8 currencies, and the Czech Republic is legally bound to adopt the euro currency in the future.

The ISO 4217 code is CZK and the local acronym is Kč, which is placed after the numeric value (e.g., "50 Kč") or sometimes before it (as is seen on the 10-koruna coin). One crown is made up of 100 hellers (abbreviated as "h", official name in Czech: singular: , nominative plural: , genitive plural:  – used with numbers higher or equal to 5 – e.g. ), but hellers have now been withdrawn from circulation, and the smallest unit of physical currency is 1 Kč.

History
In 1892, the Austro-Hungarian crown replaced the florin, at the rate of one florin to two crowns (which is also the reason why the 10 Kč coin had been nicknamed  or "fiver" - and has been in use in informal conversation up until nowadays). The name was suggested by the emperor, Franz Joseph I of Austria. After Austria-Hungary dissolved in 1918, Czechoslovakia was the only successor state to retain the name of its imperial-era currency. In the late 1920s, the Czechoslovak crown was the hardest currency in Europe. During the Second World War, the currency on the occupied Czech territory was artificially weakened. The Czechoslovak crown was restored after the war. It underwent a highly controversial monetary reform in 1953.

The Czech koruna replaced the Czechoslovakian crown when it was introduced in 1993 after the dissolution of Czechoslovakia. It first consisted of overstamped 20 Kčs, 50 Kčs, 100 Kčs, 500 Kčs, and 1,000 Kčs banknotes, and a new series was properly introduced in 1993.

In November 2013, the Czech National Bank (ČNB) intervened to weaken the exchange rate of the koruna through a monetary stimulus  to stop the currency from excessive strengthening. This was meant to support the Czech economy, mainly focused on export, but people were unhappy about this step because it was set up before Christmas, which led to raising the prices of imported goods. In late 2016, the ČNB stated that the return to conventional monetary policy was planned for mid-2017. After higher-than-expected inflation and other figures, the national bank removed the cap at a special monetary meeting on April 6, 2017. The koruna avoided significant volatility and City Index Group stated: "If you want to drop a currency peg, then the ČNB can show you how to do it".

Euro adoption discussion

The Czech Republic planned to adopt the euro in 2010, but its government suspended that plan indefinitely in 2005. Although the country is economically well positioned to adopt the euro, there is considerable opposition to the move within the Czech Republic. According to a survey conducted in April 2014, only 16% of the Czech population was in favour of replacing the koruna with the euro. As reported by an April 2018 survey by CVVM (Public Opinion Research Center), this value has remained at nearly identical levels over the past four years, with only 20% of the Czech population above 15 years old supporting euro adoption.

Coins

The coins of the Czech koruna increase in size and weight with value.

In 1993, coins were introduced in denominations of 10, 20 and 50 hellers (h), 1 Kč, 2 Kč, 5 Kč, 10 Kč, 20 Kč and 50 Kč. The 10 h and 20 h coins were taken out of circulation by 31 October 2003 and the 50 h coins by 31 August 2008 due to their diminishing purchasing power and circulation. However, financial amounts are still written with the accuracy of 1-haléř (CZK 0.01); prices in retail shops are usually multiples of CZK 0.10. When cash transactions are made, the amount is rounded to the nearest integer.

In 2000, the 10 Kč and 20 Kč coins were minted with different obverses to commemorate the millennium. In 1993 and 1994, coins were minted in Winnipeg and Hamburg, then in the Czech Republic.

Since 1997, sets for collectors are also issued yearly with proof-quality coins. Also, a tradition exists of issuing commemorative coins – including silver and gold coins – for numismatic purposes.

For a complete listing, see Commemorative coins of the Czech Republic.

Banknotes
The first Czech banknotes were issued on 8 February 1993 and consisted of Czechoslovak notes with adhesive stamps affixed to them. Only the 100 Kčs, 500 Kčs and 1,000 Kčs notes were overstamped, the lower denominations circulated unchanged during this transitional period. Each stamp bears a Roman and Arabic numeral identifying the denomination of the banknote to which it is affixed (C and 100, D and 500, M and 1,000). Subsequent issues of the 1,000 Kč note replaced the adhesive stamp with a printed image of same.

A newly designed series of banknotes in denominations of 20 Kč, 50 Kč, 100 Kč, 200 Kč, 500 Kč, 1,000 Kč and 5,000 Kč were introduced later in 1993 and are still in use at present – except for 20 Kč, 50 Kč and the first versions of 1,000 Kč and 5,000 Kč notes, since the security features of 1,000 Kč and 5,000 Kč notes were upgraded in the subsequent issues (The 2,000 Kč note, which was introduced in 1996, is still valid in all versions, with and without the new security features). These banknotes, designed by Oldřich Kulhánek, feature renowned Czech persons on the obverse and abstract compositions on the reverse. Modern protective elements can be found on all banknotes.

In 2007, the Czech National Bank started issuing new upgraded banknotes with upgraded security features. These include a new colour-shifting security thread, additional watermarks and EURion constellations. The first denomination to be issued with the new features was the 2,000 Kč, followed by the 1,000 Kč in 2008, the 500 Kč and 5,000 Kč in 2009 and finally ending with the issuance of the 100 Kč and 200 Kč notes in 2018.

Stamped banknotes

Current banknotes

Upgraded banknotes

Commemorative banknotes

Exchange rates

Historic rates

The currency had a record exchange rate run in 2008.

Most traded currencies (since 31 December 2008):

Current rates

See also
 Bohemia and Moravia crown
 Commemorative coins of the Czech Republic
 Czech Republic and the euro
 Czechoslovak crown
 Economy of the Czech Republic
 Slovak crown

References

External links

 Czech banknotes, Czech National Bank
 Czech coins, Czech National Bank
 Czech banknotes (catalog, gallery and other details, history)
 
 

Currencies of the Czech Republic
Currencies introduced in 1993
Currency symbols